Mount Hikurangi may refer to:

Mount Hikurangi (Gisborne District), New Zealand
Mount Hikurangi (Northland), New Zealand
Hikurangi, a volcanic cone near Hikurangi, in Northland, New Zealand
Hikurangi, a cone near Taumarunui, New Zealand

See also
Ikurangi, a peak in the Cook Islands